Incorporated on January 13, 1832, the Tuscumbia, Courtland and Decatur Railroad was a railroad in Alabama, the United States.

The Tuscumbia, Courtland and Decatur Railroad ran from Decatur in Morgan County through the northern half of Lawrence County through Courtland, then into Colbert County and ended in Tuscumbia, Alabama where it connected to the Tuscumbia Railway Company.

Construction began in mid-1832, the first segment between Tuscumbia and Leighton was completed in November of that year.  Traffic between those two cities began at the day of completion.  The second segment between Leighton and Decatur was completed in June 1834.

Construction was speedy because of the large cotton industry in North Alabama.  Barges could not pass through the rapids caused by the Shoals along the Tennessee River between Florence, and Decatur.  The Shoals Canal was congested and the state pursued funding for a railroad between The Shoals and the calmer waters in Decatur.

In 1850 it was incorporated into the Memphis and Charleston Railroad which eventually merged into the Southern Railway, a predecessor of Norfolk Southern. The line is still operated by Norfolk Southern Railway and serves as a vital railroad link between The Shoals, and the city of Decatur.

See also 
 Oldest railroads in North America

References

External links 
 Old Rail History Website listing with details and map
National Transportation Enhancements Clearinghouse - Tuscumbia Landing

Defunct Alabama railroads
Landmarks in Alabama
Transportation in Morgan County, Alabama
Transportation in Lawrence County, Alabama
Transportation in Colbert County, Alabama
Huntsville-Decatur, AL Combined Statistical Area
Decatur, Alabama
Decatur metropolitan area, Alabama
Florence–Muscle Shoals metropolitan area
Predecessors of the Southern Railway (U.S.)
Railway companies established in 1832
Railway companies disestablished in 1847
5 ft gauge railways in the United States
American companies established in 1832